King of Thieves (Agẹṣinkólé) is a 2022 Nigerian thriller film produced by Femi Adebayo and directed by Tope Adebayo and Adebayo Tijani. It stars Odunlade Adekola, Femi Adebayo, Toyin Abraham, Broda Shaggi, Adebowale "Debo" Adedayo aka Mr Macaroni, Lateef Adedimeji, and Ibrahim Chatta. The Epic Yoruba-language movie was produced by Femi Adebayo's Euphoria360 media and co-produced by the Niyi Akinmolayan's Anthill studios. The movie's premiere was held on April 4, 2022, and the star-studded event was held at the IMAX Cinemas, Lekki, Lagos which featured lot of trends and talk-point. The movie hit the cinema nationwide from April 8, 2022,

Selected Cast 
Femi Adebayo as Agesinkole
Odunlade Adekola as King of Ajeromi
Toyin Abraham as Queen of Ajeromi
Ibrahim Chatta
Lateef Adedimeji
Aisha Lawal
Broda Shaggi
Segun Arinze - Narrator 
Mr Macaroni
Dele Odule
Adebayo Salami

Synopsis 
King of Thieves (Ògúndábède) is a story of a famous town and prosperous kingdom of Ajeromi, things were going as good as they should be in the Ajeromi kingdom until Agesinkole, a powerful bandit and terrorist came to terrorize the peaceful and prosperous kingdom of Ajeromi, the Ajeromi Kingdom however sought to destroy this Agesinkole bandit with just every power within them including their hunters, witches, wizard and every power they possess.

Premiere 
King of Thieves (Agesinkole) premiered on Sunday, April 4, 2022, at the IMAX Cinemas, Lekki, Lagos, the theme of the premiere was 'Epic and Dangerous' which also saw a lot of celebrities in attendance and also dressing in line with the theme, the event was star-studded and saw a lot of celebrities and big names of the industry in attendance, some of those in attendance are Tade Ogidan, Tunde Kelani, Iyabo Ojo, Antar Laniyan, Segun Arinze, Mercy Aigbe, Dayo Amusa, Eniola Ajao, Denrele Edun, Muyiwa Ademola and a host of others. Popular media company, StarTimes which Femi Adebayo is also an ambassador also hosted Femi Adebayo and congratulated him on the debut of his new movie in Cinema, the screening by the press, StarTimes team, Nollywood industry icons, and movie critics took place at the Silverbird Cinemas, Ikeja City Mall.

References 

Nigerian thriller drama films
2022 films
Yoruba-language films